Frances Cynthia Guiani-Sayadi is a Filipino politician who was mayor of Cotabato City from 2019 to 2022.

Education
Guiani-Sayadi is a lawyer by profession having obtained her law degree at the University of Mindanao in Davao City

Career

First term (2016–2019)
In the 2016 local elections, Guiani-Sayadi was elected as vice mayor of Cotabato City. Her brother, Japal Guiani Jr., was re-elected as mayor for a third term but he died a few months later Guiani Jr. on September 22, 2016 due to cardiac arrest. His sister took over as mayor as per local government succession rules and took oath the following day. She would serve the remaining term of his brother.

Guani–Sayadi would continue the policies of her brother while adding her own modification. She aimed to improved the standards of living in her city. She had an iron fist policy in dealing with crime and illegal drug use in the city favoring night patrols or ronda and implementation of a curfew for minors.

She was mayor of Cotabato City when the early 2019 two-round plebiscite which seek to establish the Bangsamoro autonomous region to be led by the Moro Islamic Liberation Front (MILF). Guani-Sayadi campaign against the inclusion of Cotabato City in the then proposed region but voters favored both the establishment of the new region and the inclusion of the city to it.  After the results became known, she publicly expressed intention to file a formal protest to the Commission on Elections.

Second term (2019–2022)
Guani–Sayadi would run in the 2019 elections for mayor. Her bid was successful becoming the first ever woman to be elected as Cotabato City mayor. She vowed to continue her policy against crime, particularly her ronda program.

She would take a critical stance against the Bangsamoro regional government. The Bangsamoro regional government has pushed for the formal turnover of Cotabato City to the region as soon as possible while Mayor Guani–Sayadi has formally requested President Rodrigo Duterte to defer the transfer of the city to Bangsamoro until June 30, 2022, when it is expected that the "BARMM bureaucracy would have been fully operational" or the original formal end of the transition period. The ceremonial turnover of the city to the Bangsamoro regional government would take place on December 20, 2020 in which she did not attend. She also opposed the extension of the transition period to 2025, when it was still a proposal.

She would take part in 2022 elections to secure a second regular term. She filed a disqualification case against her political rival Mohammad Ali Matabalao alleging his campaign of engaging in vote buying  Guani–Sayadi would lose to Matabalao. She filed the case before the Commission on Election en banc but withdrew it and instead filed it with the Second Division which dismissed it for lack of jurisdiction. The city council under Matabalao's administration formally affirmed the 2019 plebiscite which led to Cotabato City's inclusion to the Bangsamoro.

Personal life
Guiani-Sayadi is married to Umbra Sayad and have three children. Her husband works for the National Fire Academy.

References

Mayors of Cotabato City
Filipino politicians
Women mayors of places in the Philippines
1960s births
Living people